Jazvenik may refer to:

 Jazvenik, Bosnia and Herzegovina, a hamlet near Bugojno
 Jazvenik, Croatia, a village near Sisak